Ophiomorus blanfordii, also known commonly as Blanford's snake skink, is a species of lizard in the family Scincidae. The species is native to Western Asia and South Asia.

Etymology
The specific name, blanfordii, is in honor of English naturalist William Thomas Blanford.

Geographic range
O. blanfordii is found in southeastern Iran and northwestern Pakistan.

Description
The legs are small and underdeveloped. Each front foot has four toes, and each hind foot has three toes.

Reproduction
O. blanfordii is viviparous.

References

Further reading
Blanford WT (1879). "Notes on Reptilia". Journal of the Asiatic Society of Bengal 48 (3): 127–132. (Zygnidopsis brevipes, new species, p. 128).
Sindaco R, Jeremčenko VK (2008). The Reptiles of the Western Palearctic. 1. Annotated Checklist and Distributional Atlas of the Turtles, Crocodiles, Amphisbaenians and Lizards of Europe, North Africa, Middle East and Central Asia. (Monographs of the Societas Herpetologica Italica). Latina, Italy: Edizioni Belvedere. 580 pp. .

Ophiomorus
Taxa named by William Thomas Blanford
Reptiles described in 1879